Norman Kenneth Campbell,  (February 4, 1924 – April 12, 2004) was a Canadian composer, television producer, and television director best known for co-writing Anne of Green Gables - The Musical.

Born in Los Angeles, he joined CBC Vancouver as a radio producer in 1948. In 1952, he went to Toronto to produce the early CBC Television broadcasts. He produced and directed hundreds of television programs between the 1950s and 1990s, including a drama Ballerina (1966). He directed episodes of All in the Family, The Mary Tyler Moore Show and One Day at a Time. In 1978, he was made an Officer of the Order of Canada "in recognition of the distinction he has brought to Canadian theatre through the operas, ballets, plays and musical comedies he has produced on stage and television for well over a quarter-century".
 Campbell directed six episodes of CBC Television/HBO's family program, Fraggle Rock during the 1980s. In 1998, he was awarded the Order of Ontario for his "many celebrated musical scores over the years, including Anne of Green Gables, an international favourite for more than 30 years".
 He was named a member of the Royal Canadian Academy of Arts in 1975.

References

External links
 
 CBC Radio 1982 broadcast: CBC pioneer Norman Campbell looks back on career
 Norman Kenneth Campbell at The Canadian Encyclopedia
 
 Canadian Communications Foundation profile

1924 births
2004 deaths
Canadian musical theatre composers
Canadian television directors
Officers of the Order of Canada
Members of the Order of Ontario
Canadian television producers
Members of the Royal Canadian Academy of Arts
20th-century Canadian composers